The 2014 Student Spartakiada were held at the Penza Sports Palace in Penza, Russia from July 1 to 4. The competition featured junior gymnasts in the Master of Sport division.

Medal winners

Individual all-around

Vault

Uneven Bars

Balance Beam

Floor Exercise

External links
  Official site

2014 in gymnastics